Elections to the Labour Party's Shadow Cabinet (more formally, its "Parliamentary Committee") occurred in November 1973.  In addition to the 12 members elected, the Leader (Harold Wilson), Deputy Leader (Edward Short), Labour Chief Whip (Bob Mellish), Chairman of the Parliamentary Labour Party (Fred Willey), Labour Leader in the House of Lords (Baron Shackleton), and Labour Chief Whip in the Lords (Baroness Llewelyn-Davies) were automatically members.  The Labour Lords elected one further member, Baron Champion.

The 12 winners of the election are listed below:

References

1979
Labour Party Shadow Cabinet election
Labour Party (UK) Shadow Cabinet election